B. nobilis may refer to:

 Banksia nobilis, the golden dryandra, great dryandra or kerosene bush, a shrub species endemic to Western Australia
 Bismarckia nobilis, a flowering plant species in the palm family endemic to western and northern Madagascar
 Bombus nobilis, a bumblebee species

See also
 Nobilis (disambiguation)